Shubhlakshmi Sharma is an Indian cricketer. She is Left-hand batsman and Left-arm medium bowler.

Early life
Shubhlakshmi Sharma born at Hazaribagh, Jharkhand on 31 December 1989.
Studied at Carmel Girls High School, Hazaribagh Pin-825301 h

References

1989 births
Living people
Indian women cricketers
India women One Day International cricketers
People from Hazaribagh
Cricketers from Jharkhand
Sportswomen from Jharkhand
India women Twenty20 International cricketers